The Sweden women's national under-19 volleyball team represents Sweden in international women's volleyball competitions and friendly matches under the age 19 and it is ruled and managed by the Swedish Volleyball Federation That is an affiliate of Federation of International Volleyball FIVB and also a part of European Volleyball Confederation CEV.

History

Results

Summer Youth Olympics
 Champions   Runners up   Third place   Fourth place

FIVB U19 World Championship
 Champions   Runners up   Third place   Fourth place

Europe Girls' Youth Championship
 Champions   Runners up   Third place   Fourth place

Team

Current squad
The Following players is the Swedish players that Competed in the 2018 Girls' U17 Volleyball European Championship Qualifiacations

References

External links
 www.volleyboll.se

National women's under-18 volleyball teams
Volleyball
Volleyball in Sweden